Bulga is a locality located in the local government area of the Rural City of Swan Hill, Victoria, Australia. Bulga post office opened in 1905, renamed Bulga State School in 1906, renamed back to Bulga in 1935 and was closed on the 31 March 1953.

References

Towns in Victoria (Australia)
Rural City of Swan Hill